Angelo Lo Jacono (Paternò, 1838- Paterno, 29 December 1898) was an Italian writer and journalist.

Biography
He studied at the Seminary of Catania, but he devoted himself later to literature.

Back in his birth town, he worked as a lawyer and published essays, tales and poems. He translated Virgil's Georgics into Italian language and worked for the farming publication L'agricoltore calabro-siculo.

Publications
Miscellanea Letteraria - Catania, Tipografia dell' Ateneo Siculo (1862)
Le Georgiche di Virgilio tradotte in versi italiani - Catania (1863)
Emmanuelide - Catania, Pastore (1879)

Merits 
Order of the Crown of Italy

Notes

Bibliography
S. Correnti - Paternò - Palermo, Nuova Trinacria, 1973.
G. Savasta - Memorie storiche della città di Paternò - Catania, Galati, 1905.

1838 births
1898 deaths
People from Paternò
Italian male writers
Journalists from Sicily
Writers from Sicily